Habban Valley is a village in India which is 70 km from Solan via Rajgarh.

Geography
The Habban Valley is surrounded by forests of deodar and is located in the hills of Sirmaur, a lush green village that is 6770 ft in elevation and is 70 km from Solan. Direct buses are available from Shimla, Solan, and Rajgarh but personal vehicles are also driven within the area.

The weather is usually pleasant around the year. The wildlife in the area consists of: peacocks, deer, tigers, bears, kakkar, kastura and ghol. There are also various trails within Habban Valley which include a 7-km trek to Banalidhar or take a longer trek (15 km) to Churdhar. Habban is located next 10 km away from neighboring Shaya village which contains the shrine of the widely revered Shirgul Devta.

References

Valleys of Himachal Pradesh